The Arrondissement of Tournai is a former arrondissement in the Walloon province of Hainaut, Belgium. It is both an administrative and a judicial arrondissement. However, the Judicial Arrondissement of Tournai also comprises the municipality of Lessines in the Arrondissement of Soignies and all municipalities of the Arrondissement of Ath, with the exception of the municipalities of Brugelette and Chièvres. In 2019 it was merged into the new Arrondissement of Tournai-Mouscron.

Municipalities

The Administrative Arrondissement of Tournai consists of the following municipalities:
 Antoing
 Brunehaut
 Celles
 Estaimpuis
 Leuze-en-Hainaut
 Mont-de-l'Enclus
 Pecq
 Péruwelz
 Rumes
 Tournai

References

Tournai